Megalohyrax is an extinct hyrax-grouped genus of herbivorous mammal that lived during the Miocene, Oligocene, and Eocene, about 55-11 million years ago. Its fossils have been found in Africa and in Asia Minor.

Description
This animal was very different from the current hyraxes and much larger, generally reaching the size of a tapir and sometimes exceeding  in length. The legs were strong and the body very massive. The skull was long and low, unlike that of today's hyraxes, and could reach  in length. The dental formula of Megalohyrax was composed of three incisors, one canine, four premolars and three molars. It likely had an eustachian tube.

Classification and habitats
It was first described by Andrews in 1903. The type species is Megalohyrax eocaenus, was found in the El Fayum area in Egypt. Other fossils attributed to this kind have been found in Saudi Arabia and Ethiopia.

See also
 Titanohyrax
 Gigantohyrax
 Largest prehistoric animals

References

 Andrews, CW 1903. "Notes on an expedition to the Fayum, Egypt, with descriptions of some new mammals". Geological Magazine 4: 337–343.
 CW Andrews. 1906. A Descriptive Catalogue of the Tertiary Vertebrata of Fayum, Egypt 1–324
 J. Sudre. 1979. "Nouveaux MAMMIFERES eocenes du Sahara occidental". Palaeovertebrata 9 (3): 83–115
 DT Rasmussen and EL Simons. 1988. "New Oligocene hyracoids from Egypt". Journal of Vertebrate Paleontology 8 (1): 67–83
 JGM Thewissen, Simons EL (2001) "Skull of Megalohyrax eocaenus (Hyracoidea, Mammalia) from the Oligocene of Egypt". Journal of Vertebrate Paleontology 21: 98–106.
 J. Kappelman, DT Rasmussen, WJ Sanders, M. Feseha, T. Bown, P. Copeland, J. Crabaugh, J. Fleagle, M. Glantz, A. Gordon, B. Jacobs, M. Maga, K. Muldoon, A. Pan, L. Pyne, B. Richmond, T. Ryan, ER Seiffert, S. Sen, L. Todd, MC Wiemann and A. Winkler. 2003. "Oligocene mammals from Ethiopia and faunal exchange between Afro-Arabia and Eurasia". Nature 426: 549–552

Prehistoric placental genera
Fossil taxa described in 1903
Prehistoric hyraxes